Bromodichloromethane is a trihalomethane with formula CHBrCl2.

Bromodichloromethane has formerly been used as a flame retardant, and a solvent for fats and waxes and because of its high density for mineral separation. Now it is only used as a reagent or intermediate in organic chemistry.

Bromodichloromethane can also occur in municipally-treated drinking water as a by-product of the chlorine disinfection process.

Notes

External links
 
 Bromodichloromethane at The Carcinogenic Potency Database
 Toxicological Profile at ATSDR

Organochlorides
Halomethanes
IARC Group 2B carcinogens
Organobromides